The Cardiff Rage are a defunct ice hockey team that were based in Cardiff, Wales. They played in the British National League during the 1997-98 season. The following season (98-99) they played in the English Division One (South) winning the South section before losing to Sunderland in the National semi final. The 1999-00 would see the Rage enter the English Premier League. Many of their "star" players from the previous season were recruited by Superleague and BNL teams leaving the roster very inexperienced. They tied against Oxford (who also left the EPL) but lost every other game before folding mid-season due to finances.

Some of the notable players that played for the Cardiff Rage are current GB captain Jonathan Phillips, Phil Hill, Neil Francis, plus regular EPL goalies Gregg Rockman, Matt Van Der Velden and Chris Douglas.

Schedule And Results
The * indicates these games were played for 4 points.

References

Ice hockey teams in Wales
Sport in Cardiff